Théâtre National de l'Opéra may refer to:

 Paris Opera, an opera company with former official title Théâtre National de l'Opéra
 Salle Le Peletier, a theatre used by Théâtre National de l'Opéra 1870–1873
 Palais Garnier, a theatre used by Théâtre National de l'Opéra 1875–1939